University Heights is a 2004 American drama film written and directed by Scott Beck (in his feature directorial debut). University Heights boasts a sweeping ensemble cast in the story of four lives on a college campus - a drug-dealing professor, a teacher struggling with his homosexuality, a drug-abusing student, and a bigot trying to escape his hateful tendencies. Chronicled with tales of love, loss, abuse, and frayed relationships, University Heights is ultimately a story of redemption. The film was shot entirely in Iowa and many scenes were filmed at the University of Iowa. Beck and partner Bryan Woods secured a deal with MTV Films after winning MTVU's Best Film on Campus competition with the film.

Cast
 Jim Siokos as Tom
 Shane Simmons as Grant
 Travis Shepherd as Jake
 Sabien Minteer as Brent
 Justin Marxen as Tim
 Lindsey Husak as Katie
 Casey Campbell as Lou
 Brad Fandel as Frank

References

External links
 
 
University Heights review by Linda Cook

2004 films
2004 directorial debut films
2004 drama films
2004 independent films
2004 LGBT-related films
2000s American films
2000s English-language films
American drama films
American independent films
American LGBT-related films
Films set in universities and colleges
Films shot in Iowa
Gay-related films
LGBT-related drama films